Veselin Vujović (born 18 January 1961) is a Montenegrin handball coach and former professional player. He is the current coach of Iran national team.

As a player, Vujović competed at the 1984 and 1988 Summer Olympics for the Yugoslavia national team.

Playing career

During his career Vujović played for RK Metaloplastika, Barcelona and Granollers. At Metaloplastika, he was part of the club golden generation during the 1980s, winning seven league titles, 4 cup titles and two European Champions Cup titles. Vujović also lost one final in 1984 and three semi-final matches in the European Champions Cup while playing for Metaloplastika.

In 1986 he was named as the best athlete of Yugoslavia.

He was first player to receive title of the IHF World Player of the Year.

In 1984 he was a member of the Yugoslav national team which won the gold medal at the Olympics. He played all six matches and scored 28 goals.
Four years later he was part of the Yugoslav team which won the bronze medal. He played all six matches again and scored 29 goals.

Honours

Player
Metaloplastika
Yugoslav First League: 1981–82, 1982–83, 1983–84, 1984–85, 1985–86, 1986–87, 1987–88
Yugoslav Cup: 1980, 1983, 1984, 1986
European Champions Cup: 1984–85, 1985–86

Barcelona
Liga ASOBAL: 1988–89, 1989–90, 1990–91, 1991–92
Copa del Rey: 1990, 1993
Supercopa ASOBAL: 1988–89, 1989–90, 1990–91, 1991–92
European Champions Cup: 1990–91
Catalan League: 1990–91, 1991–92, 1992–93

Granollers
Copa ASOBAL: 1994
EHF Cup: 1995

Individual
Yugoslavia all-time top scorer – 738
Athlete of the Year in Yugoslavia – 1986
IHF World Player of the Year – 1988
Handball player of the Year in Yugoslavia: 1986, 1988

Manager
FR Yugoslavia
2000 Summer Olympics – 4th place

Ciudad Real
Copa del Rey: 2001, 2003
EHF Cup Winners' Cup: 2002, 2003

Serbia and Montenegro
World Championship U-19: 2005

Vardar
Macedonian Super League: 2006–07, 2008–09, 2012–13
Macedonian Cup: 2007, 2008, 2012
SEHA League: 2011–12

Al Sadd
Qatar First Division: 2009–10
Qatar Crown Prince Cup: 2010

Zagreb
Dukat Premier League: 2014–15, 2015–16
Croatian Cup: 2015, 2016

Slovenia
2017 World Championship – 3rd place

References

External links
Profile
 

1961 births
Living people
Sportspeople from Cetinje
Yugoslav male handball players
Montenegrin male handball players
Liga ASOBAL players
Handball players at the 1984 Summer Olympics
Handball players at the 1988 Summer Olympics
Olympic handball players of Yugoslavia
Olympic gold medalists for Yugoslavia
Olympic bronze medalists for Yugoslavia
Olympic medalists in handball
Montenegrin handball coaches
RK Zagreb coaches
Expatriate handball players
FC Barcelona Handbol players
Medalists at the 1988 Summer Olympics
Medalists at the 1984 Summer Olympics
Montenegrin expatriate sportspeople in Croatia
Montenegrin expatriate sportspeople in North Macedonia
Montenegrin expatriate sportspeople in Qatar
Montenegrin expatriate sportspeople in Slovenia
Montenegrin expatriate sportspeople in Spain
Mediterranean Games gold medalists for Yugoslavia
Competitors at the 1983 Mediterranean Games
BM Granollers players
Mediterranean Games medalists in handball
Handball coaches of international teams